Texas Park Road 22 (PR 22) is a major Park Road located in Nueces and Kleberg counties along the Gulf Coast region of the U.S. state of Texas. Most of the highway's length within Corpus Christi is built up to freeway standards.

In 2021, a bridge was added along the northbound lanes as part of a construction project lasting over a year, although some residents were concerned that a boat would not be able to pass along the waterway underneath it.

Exit list

References

0022
Transportation in Kleberg County, Texas
Transportation in Nueces County, Texas
Transportation in Corpus Christi, Texas